Kumak, also known as Nêlêmwa-Nixumwak after its two dialects, is a Kanak language of northern New Caledonia.

References

New Caledonian languages
Languages of New Caledonia
Vulnerable languages